The Walter K. Foster House is a historic house at 57 Central Street in Stoneham, Massachusetts.  Built c. 1870, it is one of three surviving Italianate side hall entry houses in Stoneham.  Notable features include paneled pilasters on the corners and ornate decorative brackets above them.  The doorway is also topped by a heavy decorated hood.  Walter Kittredge Foster was an inventor and owner of a pencil sharpener factory.

The house was listed on the National Register of Historic Places in 1984, and included in the Central Square Historic District in 1990.

See also
National Register of Historic Places listings in Stoneham, Massachusetts
National Register of Historic Places listings in Middlesex County, Massachusetts

References

Houses on the National Register of Historic Places in Stoneham, Massachusetts
Italianate architecture in Massachusetts
Houses completed in 1870
Houses in Stoneham, Massachusetts
Historic district contributing properties in Massachusetts